The Battle of Lehola was fought in 1215 between the Livonian Brothers of the Sword, a crusading military order, and the Estonians.

History 
In the spring of 1215, a Crusader force with their allies raided the Sakala County. The plundering, however, was done in the northern section of the county. Afterwards, the crusader army besieged the stronghold of Lõhavere (Leole) that belonged to the elder Lembitu. The Estonian forces inside the stronghold confronted the enemy and "gave them a big scare". The besiegers nevertheless managed to light the stronghold on the third day. The Estonians weren't able to put the fire out and were forced to come out and surrender. During the christening, however, the German army invaded the stronghold and "robbed everything that could be robbed". Lembitu along with other elders were taken with the Germans, but were released soon after receiving the elders' sons as hostages.

References

Lehola
Lehola
1215 in Europe
Lehola
Lehola
Lehola
Lehola
Põhja-Sakala Parish